Benjamin Nugent is an American writer, best known for the book American Nerd: The Story of My People  and Good Kids, a novel.

Biography
Benjamin Nugent is the author of the novel Good Kids (Scribner), the cultural history American Nerd (Scribner), and the short story collection Fraternity (Farrar, Straus & Giroux). His short stories have appeared in The Paris Review, Tin House, and Vice, and have been anthologized in The Best American Short Stories 2014 and The Unprofessionals: New American Writing from the Paris Review.

His journalism has appeared in The New York Times Magazine, The New York Times Op/Ed Page, Time, GQ, The Washington Post, The Atlantic, and n+1. He earned the Bachelor's in English from Reed College, and was an Arts Fellow at the Iowa Writers' Workshop at the University of Iowa, where he earned the MFA in fiction.

References

External links
Audio interview regarding "American Nerd" on public radio program The Sound of Young America
Salon.com interview with Nugent
CNN.com review of Elliott Smith and the Big Nothing
Cloud Room page
n+1 article
Official Site

Living people
Writers from New York City
American male writers
Year of birth missing (living people)